Acrocercops mantica is a moth of the family Gracillariidae. It is known from China (Guangdong), Hong Kong, India (Meghalaya), Indonesia (Java), Japan (Tusima, the Ryukyu Islands, Honshū, Shikoku, Kyūshū), Korea and Nepal.

The wingspan is 7.8-10.2 mm.

The larvae feed on Castanopsis cuspidata, Castanopsis lamontii, Castanopsis sieboldii and Castanopsis tribuloides. They mine the leaves of their host plant.

References

mantica
Moths of Asia
Moths described in 1908